Dianthus cyri is a species of flowering plant in the family Caryophyllaceae, native to the Middle East. It is an annual and a halophyte.

References

cyri
Halophytes
Flora of Egypt
Flora of Western Asia
Flora of the Transcaucasus
Flora of Kazakhstan
Flora of the Gulf States
Flora of Oman
Plants described in 1838